Hungduan, officially the Municipality of Hungduan  is a 4th class municipality in the province of Ifugao, Philippines. According to the 2020 census, it has a population of 8,866 people.

It is bounded on the north-east by the town of Banaue in the east by Hingyon and on the southeast by the town of Kiangan. It borders in the south with the town of Tinoc, Ifugao. On its westside, the town is bordered by the towns of Sabangan and Bauko, Mountain Province.

Geography

Barangays
Hungduan is politically subdivided into 9 barangays. These barangays are headed by elected officials: Barangay Captain, Barangay Council, whose members are called Barangay Councilors. All are elected every three years.

 Abatan
 Bangbang
 Maggok
 Poblacion
 Bokiawan
 Hapao
 Lubo-ong
 Nungulunan
 Ba-ang

Climate

Demographics

Economy

Government
Hungduan, belonging to the lone congressional district of the province of Ifugao, is governed by a mayor designated as its local chief executive and by a municipal council as its legislative body in accordance with the Local Government Code. The mayor, vice mayor, and the councilors are elected directly by the people through an election which is being held every three years.

Elected officials

References

External links
 [ Philippine Standard Geographic Code]
Philippine Census Information
Local Governance Performance Management System 

Municipalities of Ifugao